The 2011 IFAF World Championship was the fourth instance of the IFAF World Championship, an international American football tournament. It began on July 8, 2011 with the final games commencing on July 16. It was hosted by Austria, with games taking place in three cities: Vienna, Innsbruck and Graz; Vienna hosted the medal games.

Austria won the bid to host the games. There were a record number of attendees at the 2009 IFAF Congress, the meeting which decided the host nation. The format was changed for 2011: for the first time, eight qualifying teams were divided into two groups, with the group winners competing for the Championship. Four teams automatically qualified: Austria (as host nation), the United States (as the defending World Champions), and Germany and France (for reaching the final in the 2010 EFAF European Championship. Four other teams were accepted through qualifiers in the four regions of the International Federation of American Football: Asia, Europe, Oceania and Pan-America.

The United States and Canada won Group A and Group B, respectively, and played each other in the Gold Medal match on July 16, 2011. In front of the largest crowd to ever watch a World Championship game (20,000), the United States beat Canada, 50–7.

Qualifying

List of qualified teams
The following 8 teams qualified for the final tournament.

EFAF (3)
  - qualify automatically as host nation.
  - qualify as a result of reaching the final of the 2010 EFAF European Championship.
  - qualify as a result of reaching the final of the 2010 EFAF European Championship.
PAFAF (3)
  - qualify automatically as current champions through winning the 2007 IFAF World Cup.
 
 
AFAF (1)
  - qualified after defeating South Korea in a qualifying match in February 2011 (76–0).
OFAF (1)

Venues
Below is a list of the venues which hosted games during the 2011 IFAF World Championship. Each preliminary round group was hosted in a single arena in Innsbruck (Group A) and Graz (Group B). The knockout phase and Finals took place at Ernst-Happel-Stadion in Vienna.

Rosters

Australia

Austria

Canada

France

Germany

Japan

Mexico

United States

Matches

Group 1

Group 2

7th place match

5th place match

Bronze medal match

Gold medal match

The United States routed Canada 50–7 in the gold medal game of the 2011 IFAF Senior World Championship. The 20,000 fans in attendance at Ernst Happel Stadium in Vienna, Austria, set a record for an IFAF Championship game. The game was never close, with Team USA leading 37–7 at halftime. Team USA dominated the rushing game, outgaining Canada 247-48, with four different players scoring touchdowns on the ground. While Henry Harris led the way for the Americans on the ground, with 114 yards on 15 carries and a TD, RB Nate Kmic was the only American to score two touchdowns on the day. Team USA quarterback Cody Hawkins was 13 of 21 for 161 yards and 2 TD passes. The U.S. defense recorded four sacks, and Jordan Lake caught two interceptions. One bright spot for team Canada was Shamawd Chambers, whose 7 receptions for 74 yards bested the Americans.

Individual Statistics

Passing

Receiving

All-tournament teams

Head Coach of the tournament:  Mel Tjeerdsma
MVP of the tournament:  Nate Kmic #1 RB

First team selections

Second team selections

References

IFAF World Championship
IFAF World Cup
IFAF World Cup
American football in Austria
International sports competitions hosted by Austria